Jacobi may refer to:

 People with the surname Jacobi

Mathematics:
 Jacobi sum, a type of character sum
 Jacobi method, a method for determining the solutions of a diagonally dominant system of linear equations
 Jacobi eigenvalue algorithm, a method for calculating the eigenvalues and eigenvectors of a real symmetric matrix
 Jacobi elliptic functions, a set of doubly-periodic functions
 Jacobi polynomials, a class of orthogonal polynomials
 Jacobi symbol, a generalization of the Legendre symbol
 Jacobi coordinates, a simplification of coordinates for an n-body system
 Jacobi identity for non-associative binary operations
 Jacobi's formula for the derivative of the determinant of a matrix
 Jacobi triple product an identity in the theory of theta functions
 Jacobi's theorem (disambiguation) (various)

Other:
 Jacobi Medical Center, New York
 Jacobi (grape), another name for the French/German wine grape Pinot Noir Précoce
 Jacobi (crater), a lunar impact crater in the southern highlands on the near side of the Moon
 Software_for_handling_chess_problems#Jacobi, chess software

See also 
Jacoby (disambiguation) 
Jacob
Jakob (disambiguation)
Jacobs (disambiguation)
Jacobite (disambiguation)